William Roy Brien (11 November 1930 – 27 January 1987) was an English footballer who played one game for Port Vale in the Football League on 17 April 1954.

Career
Brien joined Port Vale in May 1951 and made his debut at half-back in a goalless draw with Rochdale at Spotland on 17 April 1954. The point gained in this game was enough to clinch the Third Division North title that season, but Brien was not selected again before being released at the end of the following season.

Career statistics
Source:

Honours
Port Vale
Football League Third Division North: 1953–54

References

1930 births
1987 deaths
Footballers from Stoke-on-Trent
English footballers
Association football midfielders
Port Vale F.C. players
English Football League players